Arthur Stanley "Neddy" Smith (27 November 1944 – 8 September 2021) was an Australian criminal who was convicted of drug trafficking, theft, rape, armed robbery, and murder.

Smith served a life sentence since 1989 and was imprisoned in Lithgow Correctional Centre after he was moved from Long Bay Correctional Centre, New South Wales, where he spent 14 years. Smith's partner in crime, Graham "Abo" Henry, claimed in ABO — A Treacherous Life: The Graham Henry Story that the gang of criminals led by Smith committed crimes worth A$25 million in the 1980s.

Early life
Smith was born illegitimately on 27 November 1944 at Royal North Shore  Hospital during World War II to an Australian mother and an American sailor whom he never knew. He was brought up in the Redfern area of Sydney with his half-siblings, and was sometimes cared for by his grandmother. He was sent to boys' homes at Mittagong and Tamworth for roughly three years after becoming involved in burglaries and other offences.

Criminal career
Smith spent much of the rest of his life in prison, serving sentences from 1963 to 1965, 1968 to 1975, 1978 to 1980, and 1989 until his death. Smith was a self-confessed heroin dealer, and armed robber, who gained notoriety for his violent temper. Journalist John Dale has commented that "there is no doubting Neddy Smith's physical size and menacing aura". In Neddy: The Life and Crimes of Arthur Stanley Smith, he claimed to have beaten up former British and Commonwealth heavyweight champion Bunny Johnson after a row outside a Sydney nightclub. However, he denied committing the rape for which he was imprisoned in 1968 and the numerous murders of which he was accused.

Smith gained further notoriety when he became a whistleblower and star witness for the Independent Commission Against Corruption (ICAC) and the Wood Royal Commission. He obtained immunity for all crimes he had committed, except murder, in exchange for testifying against former New South Wales Police detective Roger Rogerson and other allegedly-corrupt police officers.

During ICAC proceedings, Smith testified that he had committed eight armed robberies and had made a large amount of money from dealing heroin. He alleged that members of New South Wales Police had given him a "green light" to commit crimes and had aided him in various robberies and other crimes. He also claimed to have paid corrupt police officers large sums of money to escape criminal charges himself and to assist his friends in avoiding criminal charges.

In his autobiography The Damage Done, Warren Fellows claimed he had witnessed Smith make death threats against two police officers, who attempted to take him in for questioning on his daughter's tenth birthday. Fellows also alleges that he was working for Smith when he was arrested in Thailand for attempting to smuggle  of heroin back to Australia. Fellows was travelling in the company of Smith's brother-in-law, Paul Hayward, who was also charged with trafficking.

Though Smith was charged with eight murders, he was convicted only of the murder of brothel owner Harvey Jones and the murder-in-company of a tow-truck driver named Ronnie Flavell during an incident of road rage on 30 October 1987.

At a Perth coronial inquest in August 2017, it was alleged that Smith was contracted to murder brothel-keeper Shirley Finn in June 1975.

Popular culture

Blue Murder TV miniseries
Smith's claimed exploits and those of allegedly-corrupt New South Wales police officers are depicted in the miniseries Blue Murder, based on Smith's book, Neddy, and produced by Australia's public broadcaster, ABC TV. First aired in most of Australia in 1995, the show was banned in New South Wales until 2001 because of the ICAC hearings, the Wood Royal Commission and outstanding contempt of court charges. Australian actor Tony Martin played Smith, and Richard Roxburgh played Rogerson.

In Blue Murder, Smith is shown murdering whistleblower prostitute Sallie-Anne Huckstepp. Smith was recorded in his prison cell confessing to that crime and later made the same confession to his publisher. However, he has otherwise consistently denied involvement in the murder and has maintained that he knew that he was being secretly recorded in his cell and made the statement to gain publicity for his book. He was subsequently charged with Huckstepp's murder, but was acquitted. In his second book, Catch and Kill Your Own, Smith implies ignorance, but told writer John Dale that he knew who committed her murder and would release the information once the killer was dead.

Later life
Diagnosed with Parkinson's disease in 1981, Smith served 14 years in Long Bay Correctional Centre, New South Wales, and was a regular patient at the prison hospital. In 2003, he was moved to Lithgow Correctional Centre.

In 2008, The Daily Telegraph reported that his Parkinson's medication had ceased being effective and that Smith's health had deteriorated, leaving him unable to maintain balance and using a wheelchair. Smith continued to refuse to assist police with ongoing investigations of unsolved murders, which were not covered by the immunity granted to him in exchange for his testimony against allegedly-corrupt police officers at the ICAC and the Wood Royal Commission hearings.

In April 2017, Smith attempted to escape custody while being treated for heart problems at the Prince of Wales Hospital, in Randwick, New South Wales. He allegedly snuck past two prison guards, only to be caught by nurses in the corridor.

Smith died on 8 September 2021 in the Long Bay prison hospital, aged 76.

References

Further reading
 Fellows, W., Marx, J., The Damage Done, Pan Macmillan Australia 1997 
 Smith, A.S. Catch and Kill Your Own: Behind the Killings the Police Don't Want to Solve, Pan Macmillan Australia, Sydney, 1997 
 Smith, A.S., Noble, T. Neddy: The Life and Crimes of Arthur Stanley Smith, Noble House, Sydney 
 Blue Murder, a re-imagined history
 Director of Public Prosecutions v Arthur Stanley Smith Attorney General for the State of New South Wales v Arthur Stanley Smith
 Lock me up in Long Bay, pleads sickly gangster Neddy Smith
 Neddy the family man by his ex-wife
 Regina v Arthur Stanley Smith (2000)
 Regina v Arthur Stanley Smith Matter No 70082/96
 Royal Commission into the NSW Police Service Final Report - Volume 1 - Corruption
 Royal Commission into the NSW Police Service Final Report - Volume 2 - Reform

1944 births
2021 deaths
People from Sydney
Australian prisoners sentenced to life imprisonment
Australian crime writers
People convicted of robbery
Australian drug traffickers
People with Parkinson's disease
Australian rapists
Prisoners sentenced to life imprisonment by New South Wales
Australian whistleblowers
Australian people convicted of murder
Australian people of American descent
People convicted of murder by New South Wales
Australian people convicted of rape
Australian non-fiction writers
Australian robbers
Criminals from New South Wales
Australian organised crime figures
Organised crime in Sydney